The mosquito genus Aedes includes the following species and subgenera. Where known, the listings indicate whether the species bite humans, and any pathogens that the species are known to carry.

Subgenera
 Subgenus  (Abraedes) Zavortink, 1970	 
 Subgenus  (Acartomyia) Theobald, 1903	 
 Subgenus (Aedes ) Meigen, 1818 
 Subgenus  (Aedimorphus) Theobald, 1903	 
 Subgenus  (Alanstonea) Mattingly, 1960	 
 Subgenus  (Albuginosus) Reinert, 1987 
 Subgenus  (Ayurakitia) Thurman, 1954	 
 Subgenus  (Aztecaedes) Zavortink, 1972	 
 Subgenus  (Belkinius) Reinert, 1982	 
 Subgenus  (Bifidistylus) Reinert, Harbach and Kitching, 2009 
 Subgenus  (Borichinda) Harbach and Rattanarithikul, 2007
 Subgenus  (Bothaella) Reinert, 1973	 
 Subgenus  (Bruceharrisonius Reinert, 2003 
 Subgenus  (Cancraedes) Edwards, 1929	 
 Subgenus  (Catageomyia) Theobald, 1903 
 Subgenus  (Catatassomyia) Dyar and Shannon, 1925
 Subgenus (Christophersiomyia) Barraud, 1923	 
 Subgenus  (Coetzeemyia) Huang, Mathis and Wilkerson, 2010	 
 Subgenus  (Collessius) Reinert, Harbach and Kitching, 2006	 
 Subgenus  (Cornetius) Huang, 2005	 
 Subgenus  (Dahliana) Reinert, Harbach and Kitching, 2006	 
 Subgenus  (Danielsia) Theobald, 1904	 
 Subgenus  (Dendroskusea) Edwards, 1929	 
 Subgenus  (Diceromyia) Theobald, 1911	 
 Subgenus  (Dobrotworkyius) Reinert, Harbach and Kitching, 2006	 
 Subgenus  (Downsiomyia) Vargas, 1950	 
 Subgenus  (Edwardsaedes) Belkin, 1962	 
 Subgenus  (Elpeytonius) Reinert, Harbach and Kitching, 2009
 Subgenus  (Finlaya) Theobald, 1903	 
 Subgenus  (Fredwardsius) Reinert, 2000
 Subgenus  (Georgecraigius) Reinert, Harbach and Kitching, 2006	 
 Subgenus  (Geoskusea) Edwards, 1929	 
 Subgenus  (Gilesius) Reinert, Harbach and Kitching, 2006	 
 Subgenus  (Gymnometopa) Coquillett, 1906	 
 Subgenus  (Halaedes) Belkin, 1962	 
 Subgenus  (Himalaius) Reinert, Harbach and Kitching, 2006	 
 Subgenus  (Hopkinsius) Reinert, Harbach and Kitching, 2006	 
 Subgenus  (Howardina) Theobald, 1903	 
 Subgenus  (Huaedes) Huang, 1968	 
 Subgenus  (Hulecoeteomyia) Theobald, 1904	 
 Subgenus  (Indusius) Edwards in Barraud, 1934	 
 Subgenus  (Isoaedes) Reinert, 1979
 Subgenus  (Jarnellius) Reinert, Harbach and Kitching, 2006	 
 Subgenus  (Jihlienius) Reinert, Harbach and Kitching, 2006 
 Subgenus  (Kenknightia) Reinert, 1990	 
 Subgenus  (Kompias) Aitken, 1941
 Subgenus  (Leptosomatomyia) Theobald, 1905
 Subgenus  (Levua) Stone and Bohart, 1944 
 Subgenus  (Lewnielsenius) Reinert, Harbach and Kitching, 2006	 
 Subgenus  (Lorrainea) Belkin, 1962	 
 Subgenus  (Luius) Reinert, Harbach and Kitching, 2008 
 Subgenus  (Macleaya) Theobald, 1903 
 Subgenus  (Molpemyia) Theobald, 1910
 Subgenus  (Mucidus) Theobald, 1901	
 Subgenus  (Neomelaniconion) Newstead, 1907 
 Subgenus  (Nyctomyia) Harbach, 2013	 
 Subgenus  (Ochlerotatus) Lynch Arribálzaga, 1891 
 Subgenus  (Paraedes) Edwards, 1934
 Subgenus  (Patmarksia) Reinert, Harbach and Kitching, 2006 
 Subgenus  (Paulianius) Brunhes and Boussés, 2017	 
 Subgenus  (Petermattinglyius) Reinert, Harbach and Kitching, 2009
 Subgenus  (Phagomyia) Theobald, 1905 
 Subgenus  (Polyleptiomyia) Theobald, 1905 
 Subgenus  (Protomacleaya) Theobald, 1907 
 Subgenus  (Pseudalbuginosus) Huang and Rueda, 2015	
 Subgenus  (Pseudarmigeres) Stone and Knight, 1956	 
 Subgenus  (Pseudoskusea) Theobald, 1907
 Subgenus  (Rampamyia) Reinert, Harbach and Kitching, 2006	 
 Subgenus  (Reinertia) Somboon, Namgay and Harbach in Somboon, Phanitchakun, Saingamsook, Namgay and Harbach, 2021	 
 Subgenus  (Rhinoskusea) Edwards, 1929	 
 Subgenus  (Rusticoidus) Shevchenko and Prudkina, 1973 
 Subgenus  (Sallumia) Reinert, Harbach and Kitching, 2008	 
 Subgenus  (Scutomyia) Theobald, 1904	 
 Subgenus  (Skusea) Theobald, 1903	 
 Subgenus  (Stegomyia) Theobald, 1901
 Subgenus  (Tanakaius) Reinert, Harbach and Kitching, 2004	
 Subgenus  (Tewarius) Reinert, 2006
 Subgenus  (Vansomerenis) Reinert, Harbach and Kitching, 2006
 Subgenus  (Zavortinkius) Reinert, 1999

Species 

Aedes australis
Aedes aboriginis - northwest coast mosquito
 Bites humans
Aedes aegypti - yellow fever mosquito
 Bites humans, carries chikungunya, dengue fever, heartworm, Murray Valley encephalitis, Ross River virus, West Nile virus, Yellow Fever, Zika virus
Aedes africanus
Aedes albolineatus
Aedes alboniveus
Aedes albopictus - Asian tiger mosquito
 Bites humans, carries Cache Valley virus, chikungunya, dengue fever, Eastern equine encephalitis, West Nile virus, Yellow Fever, Zika virus
Aedes albolineatus
Aedes alboscutellatus
Aedes aloponotum
Aedes amesii
Aedes annulipes
Aedes arboricola
Aedes arundinariae
Aedes argenteoventralis
Aedes atlanticus
 Carries Keystone virus, West Nile virus
Aedes atropalpus also spelled Aedes atropalpos
 Bites humans, carries La Crosse virus, Plasmodium gallinaceum, St. Louis encephalitis, West Nile virus
Aedes aurifer
 Bites humans
Aedes aurimargo
Aedes aurotaeniatus
Aedes axitiosus
Aedes bahamensis
Aedes barraudi
Aedes bekkui
Aedes bicristatus
 Bites humans
Aedes bimaculatus
 Bites humans
Aedes brelandi
 Carries dengue fever
Aedes brevitibia
Aedes burgeri
Aedes cacozelus
Aedes camptorhynchus - southern saltmarsh mosquito
 Bites humans, carries Ross River Virus
Aedes canadensis
Aedes cantans
Aedes cantator - brown saltmarsh mosquito
 Bites humans, carries Eastern equine encephalitis, Jamestown Canyon virus, West Nile virus
Aedes capensis
Aedes caspius
Aedes cataphylla - woodland floodwater mosquito
 Carries heartworm, Jamestown Canyon virus
Aedes cavaticus
Aedes cinereus
 Bites humans, carries Bunyamwera virus, California encephalitis virus, Eastern equine encephalitis, Jamestown Canyon virus, Sindbis virus, West Nile virus
Aedes clivis
 Bites humans
Aedes communis
Aedes cordellieri
Aedes coulangesi
Aedes cretinus
 Bites humans
Aedes dasyorrhus
Aedes deserticola - western treehole mosquito
 Bites humans
Aedes desmotes
Aedes domesticus
Aedes dupreei
 Carries West Nile virus
Aedes eldridgei
Aedes epactius
 Carries St. Louis encephalitis
Aedes esoensis
Aedes fulvus
 Bites humans, carries Venezuelan equine encephalitis virus, West Nile virus
Aedes furcifer
Aedes futunae
Aedes ganapathi
Aedes geminus
Aedes gombakensis
Aedes grassei
Aedes grossbecki
 Bites humans, carries West Nile virus
Aedes harinasutai
Aedes helenae
Aedes hensilli
 Bites humans, carries Zika virus
Aedes hesperonotius
 Carries heartworm, La Crosse virus, Plasmodium gallinaceum
Aedes hoogstraali
Aedes horotoi
Aedes imprimens
Aedes inermis
Aedes infirmatus
 Bites humans, carries California encephalitis virus, Keystone virus, trivittatus virus, West Nile virus, Western equine encephalitis
Aedes intrudens
 Bites humans, carries Jamestown Canyon virus
Aedes japonicus 
Aedes kochi
Aedes kompi
Aedes koreicus
Aedes lineatopennis
Aedes luteocephalus
Aedes madagascarensis
Aedes malayensis
Aedes marshallii
Aedes masculinus
Aedes mediolineatus
Aedes mediovittatus
Aedes mefouensis
Aedes melanimon
 Bites humans, carries California encephalitis virus, West Nile virus, Western equine encephalitis
Aedes meronephada
Aedes michaelikati
Aedes mitchellae
 Carries Eastern equine encephalitis, Tensaw virus
Aedes mohani
Aedes monticola - western treehole mosquito
Aedes muelleri
Aedes nevadensis
Aedes ngong
Aedes niphadopsis
Aedes niveus
Aedes notoscriptus
 Bites humans, carries Ross River virus
Aedes nummatus
Aedes ostentatio
Aedes palpalis
Aedes pembaensis
Aedes pexus
Aedes polynesiensis
 Bites humans, carries Wuchereria bancrofti, dengue fever, Ross River virus
Aedes pseudoniveus
Aedes pseudonummatus
Aedes pulchritarsis
Aedes pullatus
Aedes pulverulentus
Aedes punctodes
Aedes punctor
Aedes purpureipes
Aedes purpureifemur
Aedes rempeli
Aedes rusticus
Aedes sasai
Aedes scapularis
Aedes schizopinax
Aedes scutellaris
Aedes sollicitans
 Carries West Nile virus
Aedes spilotus
Aedes squamiger
 Carries West Nile virus
Aedes stricklandi
Aedes sylvaticus
Aedes taeniorhynchus
 Carries West Nile virus
Aedes taylori
Aedes thelcter
Aedes thibaulti
Aedes thomsoni 
Aedes tiptoni 
Aedes togoi 
Aedes tormentor
Aedes tortilis
Aedes turneri
Aedes varipalpus
Aedes ventrovittis
Aedes vexans
 Carries West Nile virus, heartworm
Aedes vigilax known after the year 2000 as Ochlerotatus vigilax
 Carries Ross River virus
Aedes vittatus
Aedes washinoi
Aedes wauensis
Aedes zoosophus

References

External links
Nomina Insecta Nearctica
Fauna Europaea
Mosquito Catalog (Walter Reed Biosystematics Unit)

 List
Aedes